The Y-bar moray,
Gymnothorax ypsilon, is a deep-water moray eel found in the Pacific Ocean at depths to 185 m.

References

ypsilon
Fish described in 1992